Pienaar is a well-known Afrikaans surname, derived from the French Pinard. It was brought to South Africa in 1688 by Huguenot settlers traveling with the Dutch East India Company. The extended progenitors of the Pienaar clan are Jacques Pinard, a carpenter from Eure-et-Loir, and Esther Foucher (born Suèvres, Orléanais). After Esther's death Pinard later remarried Marthe le Fèbre, a native of Paarl. An extensive genealogy of the Pienaar family in South Africa was compiled by ZJ (Sakkie) Pienaar, and privately published as "Die Pienaars in Suid-Afrika." An updated version of the Pienaar genealogy was compiled by Christo Viljoen, whose mother was née Pienaar, as the "Pienaar Familieregister" and published by the Huguenot Society of South Africa.

Some of the descendants of the Pienaar progenitors include:

Antoinette Pienaar, South African actress and writer
Ben Pienaar, British rugby player
Dan Pienaar, South African career soldier
Francois Pienaar, South African rugby player
Gerhardus Pienaar, South African javelin thrower
John Pienaar, British journalist
Jonathan Pienaar, South African actor
Louis Pienaar, South African diplomat
Michael Pienaar, Namibian football player
Pierre de Villiers Pienaar, South African academic
Peet Pienaar, South African performance artist
Roy Pienaar, South African cricketer
Ruan Pienaar, South African rugby player
Steven Pienaar, South African football player
Susanna Pienaar, South African writer

Characters in fiction

Peter Pienaar, fictional World War I flying ace
Ross Pienaar, fictional character in the movie "District 9"

See also

Pienaarsrivier
Pienaars River
Johan Pienaar Airport

References

Surnames of French origin
Afrikaans-language surnames